Tadji Airport  is an airfield serving Tadji, near Aitape, in the Sandaun Province of Papua New Guinea.

History

The airport was built by the Japanese in 1942 and was seized by the Allies as a part of Operation Persecution during April 1944.

Airlines and destinations
(no known scheduled services)

References

External links
 

Airports in Papua New Guinea
Sandaun Province
World War II airfields in Papua New Guinea